Sebastián Gualco (26 April 1912 – 6 November 1992) was an Argentine footballer. He played in 23 matches for the Argentina national football team from 1935 to 1943. He was also part of Argentina's squad for the 1935 South American Championship.

References

External links
 

1912 births
1992 deaths
Argentine footballers
Argentina international footballers
Place of birth missing
Association football goalkeepers
Club Atlético Platense footballers
San Lorenzo de Almagro footballers
Chacarita Juniors footballers
Ferro Carril Oeste footballers
Club Atlético Huracán footballers